"Criminal Mind" is a single by Danish band Lukas Graham. The song was released in Denmark as a digital download in March 2012. It was released as the third single from their debut self-titled debut studio album. The song peaked to number four on the Danish Singles Chart. The song was written by Lukas Forchhammer, Sebastian Fogh, Stefan Forrest, Morten Ristorp and Mark Falgren.

Track listing

Chart performance

Weekly charts

Release history

References

2012 songs
2012 singles
Lukas Graham songs
Songs written by Morten Ristorp
Songs written by Lukas Forchhammer
Songs written by Stefan Forrest
Copenhagen Records singles